St. Denis Church is a Roman Catholic parish church under the authority of the Roman Catholic Archdiocese of New York, located in Hopewell Junction, Dutchess County, New York. It was established in 1899 as a parish; it was established a mission of St. Mary in Wappingers Falls in 1874 until being elevated in a parish in 1899.

History

Background
The first Priests in the Hudson Valley were French Jesuits, led by Saint Isaac Jogues, who about forty years earlier preached the Gospel to the Indians in the Mohawk Valley. It is believed that Father Jogues traveled through what later became Dutchess County before he and his companions were captured and martyred at Auriesville in 1646. Father Ferdinand Farmer reported visiting Dutchess County in October 1781. His records mention Fishkill where he baptized 14 Canadian and Acadian Catholics. He again visited the area in November 1783.

The founding of the church of St. Denis on Beekman Road was connected with Daniel DeLaney. Born in County Kilkenny, Ireland in 1801, history has it that DeLaney, at some time prior to 1852, arrived in Beekman, evidently as a farm hand in the vicinity of Sylvan Lake and observed iron ore, which he recognized by virtue of having worked in an iron mine in Ireland. He purchased land around Sylvan Lake and went into iron mining. To obtain workers for his mine, DeLaney periodically traveled to New York City where he recruited Irish immigrants straight off the boat and brought them to Sylvan Lake. Soon the miners had wives and children and the colony of Catholics in Beekman started to grow.

Mission church
In 1858 or 1860, DeLaney donated a plot of land and, with the assistance of his miners, the first St. Denis was built on a knoll on Beekman Road just over the line in East Fishkill. St. Denis became a mission church of St. Mary's in Wappinger Falls which had itself been founded in 1845. Father George Brophy, its first resident pastor, served not only the parishioners of St. Mary's but also the workers at the "ore beds" at Sylvan Lake as well as the Catholics at Fishkill Landing. The territory served by St. Denis included all of the land East of Wappinger Falls to the Connecticut line, running from the parish of Mattewan on the South to Amenia on the North. By 1909, the parish of St. Denis had churches at Sylvan Lake, Hopewell Junction and Clove, as well as stations at Moores Mills and Poughquag. A station was likely a private home where Mass was said from time to time.

In the "History of Dutchess County 1660-1909", Father William Patrick Eagen reports that in 1874 Father McSwiggan had two assistants, Rev. W.H. Murthy and Rev. Charles McMullen who served mission churches at Pawling and Dover, both of which later became full parishes.
By 1983, St. Denis parish, including its mission church of St. Columba in Hopewell Junction, encompassed over 200 square miles and ranked as one of the largest parishes in the Archdiocese.

The average attendance at Mass at St. Denis was 109, the average at Our Lady of Mercy at Clove was 31 and 35 at Hopewell Junction. He reported that the farmers would not drive their horses to church when the weather was inclement since there was no shelter for the "poor beasts", nor a way of keeping the conveyances dry. It appears that the sheds were built.

Our Lady of Mercy

Parish of St. Denis
In 1899 St. Denis ceased being a mission and became a full-fledged parish.
In 1935 calamity struck when "the church at Sylvan Lake", then 75 years old, caught fire. The building erected through the efforts of Daniel DeLaney was a total loss. By June 14, 1936, the new St. Denis was dedicated by Cardinal Patrick Hayes. The building cost $16,000 and has room for 300. The new church was an old English design with cast stone trim and brick walls. Newspaper accounts said that the pews came from St. Peter's in Poughkeepsie and that they were over 100 years old. They have since been replaced.

Pastors
1860-1874   Fr. Denis Sheehan 
1874-1877   Fr. Patrick J. Healy
1877-1884   Fr. W.J. McSwiggan
1884-1892   Fr. Charles McMullen
1892-1896   Fr. Edward J. Byrnes
1896-1901   Fr. Eugene A. Shine
1901-1903   Fr. Andrew Corsini Mearns
1903-1905   Fr. John C. McEvoy
1905-1910   Fr. William P. Egan
1910-1915   Fr. James Corridan
1915-1917   Fr. James MacDonnell
1917-1921   Fr. John P. Hines
1921-1928   Fr. Edward L. Baxter
1928-1936   Fr. Francis E. McElhinney
1936-1940   Fr. James A. Dunnigan
1940-1945   Fr. Thomas B. Brown
1945-1947   Fr. Andrew F. Carney
1948-1958   Fr. Florian G. Wermuth
1958-1959   Fr. Francis X. Harper
1959-1963   Fr. William J. Brady
1963-1968   Fr. Joseph F. Tracy
1968-1973   Fr. John J. Gannon
1973-1976   Fr. William J. McGann
1976-1989   Fr. Joseph Meehan
1989-1993   Msgr. Dominick J. Lagonegro
1993-2008   Fr. William B. Cosgrove
2008-2010   Fr. Stephen P. Norton 
2010-2012   Fr. Vincent DePaul Howley 
2012 -      Fr. Robert Porpora (present)

References

External links
Official website

Religious organizations established in 1874
Religious organizations established in 1899
Roman Catholic churches in New York (state)
Churches in Dutchess County, New York
1874 establishments in New York (state)